Daniel Joseph Kraus (February 13, 1923 – December 28, 2012) was an American professional basketball player. Kraus was selected in the 1948 BAA Draft by the Baltimore Bullets after a collegiate career at Georgetown. He played for the Bullets for one season before retiring from basketball.

Between 1951 and 1977 he served as an FBI special agent.

BAA career statistics

Regular season

References

External links

 Georgetown Basketball History: The Top 100 → 26. Dan Kraus

1923 births
2012 deaths
All-American college men's basketball players
United States Marine Corps personnel of World War II
American men's basketball players
Baltimore Bullets (1944–1954) draft picks
Baltimore Bullets (1944–1954) players
Basketball players from New York City
DeWitt Clinton High School alumni
Federal Bureau of Investigation agents
Georgetown Hoyas men's basketball players
People from Columbia, Maryland
Point guards
Sportspeople from the Bronx
United States Marines